Portugal competed at the 2014 European Athletics Championships, held in Zürich, Switzerland, from 12 to 17 August 2014. The national delegation consisted of 44 competitors (22 men and 22 women) – its largest ever at the European Athletics Championships – who took part in 27 events.
Marathon runner Jéssica Augusto finished third in the women's event to secure Portugal's only medal.

Among the medal hopefuls competing at these Championships were 2012 medalists Ana Dulce Félix (gold in women's 10,000 metres), Patrícia Mamona (silver in women's triple jump) and Sara Moreira (bronze in women's 5000 metres). Félix was not able to defend her title and finished outside the top 10. while Mamona failed to qualify for the final. Moreira finished 5th in the 10,000 metres and 6th in the 5000 metres. 
Also competing were former European men's 100 and 200 metres champion Francis Obikwelu and former Olympic and World men's triple jump winner Nelson Évora. Obikwelu participated in the 4 × 100 metres relay and helped the team qualify for the final, where they failed to finish. Évora also qualified for the final, finishing in the 6th place.

Medalists

Results
Key 
Q=Qualified by standard; q=Qualified by performance; NR=National record.

Men's events

Track and road

Field

Women's events

Track and road

Field

References
Results

Citations

Nations at the 2014 European Athletics Championships
2014
European Athletics Championships